Oshin is the debut studio album by American rock band DIIV, released on June 26, 2012, by Captured Tracks. The album was produced by frontman Zachary Cole Smith.

Composition
Regarding the album's aesthetic and lyrical content, in comparison to its follow-up, Is the Is Are (2016), frontman Zachary Cole Smith reflected: "[Oshin] was hiding a bit behind an image, behind a sound – the vocals being really textural, and a sort of ambient thing. I didn't want it to be about me as a person. The lyrics were almost like universal truths, not personal."

Release
In 2014, Oshin was briefly out of print due to legal issues regarding the original cover art. It was reissued in June 2015 with new artwork.

Reception

Critic Ian Cohen of Pitchfork said, "Oshin isn't just a gorgeous and unusually melodic dream pop record; it's an interesting experiment in whether a band based on voice/guitar/bass/drums can rely on the guitar to carry the song's meaning".

On lists of the top 50 albums of 2012, Oshin was listed 22nd by Stereogum and 40th by Pitchfork. In 2018, Pitchfork listed Oshin at number 26 on its list of the 30 best dream pop albums.

Track listing
All tracks written and produced by Zachary Cole Smith.

Personnel
Credits adapted from the liner notes of Oshin.

DIIV
 Devin Ruben Perez
 Andrew Bailey
 Zachary Cole Smith
 Colby Hewitt III

Additional musicians
 Ben Wolf (Ben Newman) – drums

Technical
 Daniel James Schlett – recording, mixing
 Nico Testa – engineering assistance
 Zachary Cole Smith – production

Artwork
 Kiakshuk – cover illustration
 Kopapik Qaqyuarqyuk – back cover illustration
 Simeonie Kopapik – liner illustration
 Sandy Kim – band photo

Charts

References

2012 debut albums
Captured Tracks albums
DIIV albums